Prairie Band Potawatomi Nation (formerly the Prairie Band of Potawatomi Indians) is a federally recognized tribe of Neshnabé (Potawatomi people), headquartered near Mayetta, Kansas.

History
The Mshkodésik ("People of the Small Prairie") division of the Potawatomi were originally located around the southern portions of Lake Michigan, in what today is southern Wisconsin, northern Illinois and northwestern Indiana. Due to their name in the Potawatomi language, the Mshkodésik were often confused with another tribe, the Mascoutens. As part of the Council of Three Fires, the Prairie Band were signatories to the 1829 Second Treaty of Prairie du Chien. Independently of the Council of Three Fires, the Prairie Band were also signatories to the 1832 Treaty of Tippecanoe as the Potawatomi Tribe of Indians of the Prairie.

Under the Indian Removal Act, the Prairie Band were forcibly relocated west, first to Missouri's Platte County in the mid-1830s and then to the vicinity of Council Bluffs, Iowa in the 1840s, where they were known as the Bluff Indians. The tribe controlled up to five million acres (20,000 km²) at both locations. After 1846, the tribe moved to present-day Kansas. At that time, the reservation was thirty square miles which included part of present-day Topeka.

During the period from the 1940s - 1960s, in which the Indian termination policy was enforced, four Kansas tribes, including the Potawatomi were targeted for termination. One of the first pieces of legislation enacted during this period was the Kansas Act of 1940 which transferred all jurisdiction for crimes committed on or against Indians from federal jurisdiction to the State of Kansas. It did not preclude the federal government from trying native people, but it allowed the state into an area of law in which had historically belonged only to the federal government.

On 1 August 1953, the US Congress passed House Concurrent Resolution 108 which called for the immediate termination of the Flathead, Klamath, Menominee, Potawatomi, and Turtle Mountain Chippewa, as well as all tribes in the states of California, New York, Florida, and Texas.  Termination of a tribe meant the immediate withdrawal of all federal aid, services, and protection, as well as the end of reservations. A memo issued by the Department of the Interior on 21 January 1954 clarified that the reference to "Potawatomi" in the Resolution meant the Prairie Band of Potawatomi Nation, the Kickapoo, the Sac and Fox and the Iowa tribes in Kansas.

Because jurisdiction over criminal matters had already been transferred to the State of Kansas by the passage of the Kansas Act of 1940 the government targeted the four tribes in Kansas for immediate termination. In February, 1954 joint hearings for the Kansas tribes were held by the House and Senate Subcommittees on Indian Affairs.

The Prairie Band of Potawatomi Nation tribal leader, Minnie Evans (Indian name: Ke-what-no-quah Wish-Ken-O) led the effort to stop termination. Tribal members sent petitions of protest to the government and multiple delegations went to testify at congressional meetings in Washington, DC. Tribal Council members Vestana Cadue, Oliver Kahbeah, and Ralph Simon of the Kickapoo Tribe in Kansas traveled at their own expense to testify as well. The strong opposition from the Potawatomi and Kickapoo tribes helped them, as well as the Sac & Fox and the Iowa Tribe, avoid termination.

Government
The Prairie Band are governed by a democratically elected tribal council. Their current administration is:
Tribal Chairperson: Joseph Rupnick - 2018 to 2022
Vice-Chairperson: Zach Pahmahmie - 2016 to 2020
Secretary: Camilla Chouteau - 2018 to 2022
Treasurer: Wade Pahmahmie - 2017 to 2020 
Council Member 1: William Evans - 2018 to 2022
Council Member 2: Raphael Wahwassuck - 2018 - 2020
Council Member 3: Shirley Trull - 2019 to 2020

Notable Prairie Band Potawatomi people 
 Charles J. Chaput, first Native American archbishop 
 Curtis J. Keltner, Green Beret, Iraq War veteran
 Jessica Rickert, the first female American Indian dentist in America, which she became upon graduating from the University of Michigan School of Dentistry in 1975. She was a direct descendant of the Indian chief Wahbememe (Whitepigeon).
Shabbona, 19th-century warrior and chief in Illinois
 Stephanie "Pyet" DeSpain, winner of Season 1 of the television cooking competition Next Level Chef

References

External links
Prairie Band of Potawatomi Nation, official website

 
Native American tribes in Kansas
American Indian reservations in Kansas
Federally recognized tribes in the United States
Jackson County, Kansas